Massachusetts House of Representatives' 14th Norfolk district in the United States is one of 160 legislative districts included in the lower house of the Massachusetts General Court. It covers parts of Middlesex County and Norfolk County. Democrat Alice Peisch of Wellesley has represented the district since 2003.

Towns represented
The district includes the following localities:
Precinct 4 in Wayland
 Wellesley
 Weston

The current district geographic boundary overlaps with those of the Massachusetts Senate's 1st Middlesex and Norfolk district, 3rd Middlesex district, and Norfolk, Bristol and Middlesex district.

Former locales
The district previously covered:
 Dover, circa 1872 
 Medfield, circa 1872 
 Needham, circa 1872

Representatives
 Lauren Kingsbury, circa 1858 
 Henry Horton, circa 1859 
 Gilbert W . Cox, Jr., circa 1975 
 Royall H. Switzler, 1979–1986
 Robert H. Marsh, 1987–1992
 Peter E. Madden, 1993–1995
 John A. Locke, 1995–2003
 Alice Hanlon Peisch, 2003-current

See also
 List of Massachusetts House of Representatives elections
 Other Norfolk County districts of the Massachusetts House of Representatives: 1st, 2nd, 3rd, 4th, 5th, 6th, 7th, 8th, 9th, 10th, 11th, 12th, 13th, 15th
 List of Massachusetts General Courts
 List of former districts of the Massachusetts House of Representatives

Images
Portraits of legislators

References

External links
 Ballotpedia
  (State House district information based on U.S. Census Bureau's American Community Survey).
 League of Women Voters of Weston
 League of Women Voters of Wellesley

House
Government of Norfolk County, Massachusetts
Government of Middlesex County, Massachusetts